The 2018 United Nations Security Council election was held on 8 June during the 72nd session of the United Nations General Assembly, held at United Nations Headquarters in New York City. The elections were for five non-permanent seats on the UN Security Council for two-year mandates commencing on 1 January 2019.

In accordance with the Security Council's rotation rules, whereby the ten non-permanent UNSC seats rotate among the various regional blocs into which UN member states traditionally divide themselves for voting and representation purposes, the five available seats are allocated as follows:

One for Africa 
One for the Asia-Pacific Group
One for Latin America and the Caribbean
Two for the Western European and Others Group

The five members will serve on the Security Council for the 2019–20 period.

In order of votes received, Germany and Belgium were elected in the Western European and Others Group, the Dominican Republic in the Latin American and Caribbean Group, and South Africa and Indonesia in the African and Asia-Pacific Groups. In addition, the Dominican Republic was elected to the Security Council for the first time.

Candidates

African Group

Asia-Pacific Group

Latin American and Caribbean Group

Western European and Others Group  

 – Withdrew in May 2018

The only contested seat was the Asia-Pacific one, between Indonesia and Maldives.

Results

African and Asia-Pacific Groups

Latin American and Caribbean Group

Western European and Others Group

See also
List of members of the United Nations Security Council
Germany and the United Nations
Israel and the United Nations
Singapore and the United Nations
European Union and the United Nations

References

2018 elections
2018
Non-partisan elections